In probability theory, a sub-Gaussian distribution is a probability distribution with strong tail decay. Informally, the tails of a sub-Gaussian distribution are dominated by (i.e. decay at least as fast as) the tails of a Gaussian. This property gives sub-Gaussian distributions their name. 

Formally, the probability distribution of a random variable  is called sub-Gaussian if there are positive constant C such that for every ,

 .

Sub-Gaussian properties 
Let  be a random variable. The following conditions are equivalent:

  for all , where  is a positive constant;
 , where  is a positive constant; 
  for all , where  is a positive constant.

Proof.  By the layer cake representation,After a change of variables , we find that

Take , then

 By Markov's inequality,

Definitions 
A random variable  is called a sub-Gaussian random variable if either one of the equivalent conditions above holds.

More equivalent definitions 
The following properties are equivalent:
  Laplace transform condition: for some B, b > 0,  holds for all .
  Moment condition: for some K > 0,  for all .
  Union bound condition: for some c > 0,  for all n > c, where  are i.i.d copies of X.

Examples 
A standard normal random variable  is a sub-Gaussian random variable.

Let  be a random variable with symmetric Bernoulli distribution. Since , it follows that and hence  is a sub-Gaussian random variable.

See also 
 Platykurtic distribution

Notes

References
 
 
 
 
 
 
 
 Vershynin, R. (2018). "High-dimensional probability: An introduction with applications in data science" (PDF). Volume 47 of Cambridge Series in Statistical and Probabilistic Mathematics. Cambridge University Press, Cambridge.
 Zajkowskim, K. (2020). "On norms in some class of exponential type Orlicz spaces of random variables". Positivity. An International Mathematics Journal Devoted to Theory and Applications of Positivity. 24(5): 1231--1240. arXiv:1709.02970. doi.org/10.1007/s11117-019-00729-6.

Continuous distributions